Milford Central is the name of an electoral ward in Pembrokeshire, Wales. It covers the central area of the town of Milford Haven including Pill and Milford Haven Docks. It elects a county councillor to Pembrokeshire County Council and three town councillors to Milford Haven Town Council.

According to the 2011 UK Census the population of the ward was 2,003 (with 1,658 of voting age).

County elections
At the May 2017 county election the sitting former Plaid Cymru councillor Stephen Joseph successfully defended his seat but by only 3 votes.

At the 2012 county election the long-standing independent councillor Anne Hughes lost her seat on Pembrokeshire County Council to the Plaid Cymru candidate. Hughes had been elected the chairman of the County Council in May 2009.

See also
 Milford Hakin
 Milford West
 List of electoral wards in Pembrokeshire

References

Pembrokeshire electoral wards
Milford Haven